Rafael Silva Guanaes (born 27 March 1981) is a Brazilian football manager and former player who played as a midfielder. He is the current manager of Operário Ferroviário.

Career
Born in São Paulo, Guanaes played for Palmeiras, Corinthians and Nacional-SP as a youth. He also played for the Campbell University's soccer team during the 1999 and 2000 campaigns, Nacional and Joseense.

On 16 June 2010, Guanaes was named manager of Joseense for the remainder of the year, replacing sacked Ricardo Longhi. He achieved promotion to Campeonato Paulista Série A3 with the club in 2012, and was appointed in charge of União São João on 6 August 2014.

Guanaes was sacked by União on 9 September 2014, but took over São Carlos on 2 December, for the ensuing campaign. He won the Campeonato Paulista Segunda Divisão in the following year with the club, but left in November 2016 as his contract expired.

On 18 November 2016, Guanaes was appointed Monte Azul manager. He took over Votuporanguense on 29 September of the following year, and won the 2018 Copa Paulista with the latter club.

On 2 January 2019, Guanaes was named manager of Athletico Paranaense's under-23 side. He won the 2019 Campeonato Paranaense with the club, and later went on to work also with the under-20s.

On 5 February 2021, Guanaes left Athletico to take over Série B side Sampaio Corrêa. Dismissed on 22 April, he replaced Bruno Pivetti at the helm of Tombense four days later.

Guanaes led Tombense to their first-ever promotion to the Série B, but was sacked on 22 February 2022, with the club threatened with relegation in the 2022 Campeonato Mineiro. He then worked for a short period as a permanent assistant manager at Cruzeiro before taking over second division side Novorizontino on 21 June.

On 3 September 2022, Guanaes was sacked by Novorizontino. On 1 November, he was announced as manager of Operário Ferroviário, recently relegated to the third level, for the upcoming season.

Honours

Manager
São Carlos
Campeonato Paulista Segunda Divisão: 2015

Votuporanguense
Copa Paulista: 2018

Athletico Paranaense
Campeonato Paranaense: 2019

References

External links

1981 births
Living people
Footballers from São Paulo
Brazilian footballers
Association football midfielders
Nacional Atlético Clube (SP) players
Clube Atlético Joseense players
Brazilian expatriate footballers
Brazilian expatriate sportspeople in the United States
Expatriate soccer players in the United States
Brazilian football managers
Campeonato Brasileiro Série B managers
Campeonato Brasileiro Série C managers
União São João Esporte Clube managers
São Carlos Futebol Clube managers
Atlético Monte Azul managers
Club Athletico Paranaense managers
Sampaio Corrêa Futebol Clube managers
Tombense Futebol Clube managers
Grêmio Novorizontino managers
Operário Ferroviário Esporte Clube managers